Oded Lowengart (עודד לוונגרט) is Professor of Marketing at the Ben-Gurion University of the Negev (BGU) in Israel, where he holds the Ernest Scheller Jr. Chair in Innovative Management and is Head of the Department of Business Administration. His two terms as Dean of the Guilford Glazer Faculty of Business and Management (2013–18) saw to opening the International MBA Program, expanded global programs, and increased Journal Citation Reports-ranked research publications.

Education

Lowengart holds a PhD from the University of Wisconsin–Milwaukee.

Research
Lowengart’s areas of interest include modeling consumer perceptions and consumer choice, market share forecasting and diagnostics. His research in 2008 focused on modeling issues in areas such as consumers’ food and fast food product choice, the effect of information and its intensity on choice processes, consumer heterogeneity, reference price, and network and social marketing.

His research on pricing aims to understand and analyze the differential effect of price expectations on consumers’ choice and optimal pricing policies. His research in information and food choices examines theoretically and empirically the effect of negative and calorie types of information on fast food selection, as well as the overall phenomenon of obesity. Current research projects also involve modeling social personal branding and its effect on pro-social behavior.

Personal life
He is married to Ayelet Lowengart, and his son Assaf Lowengart is an Olympic baseball player.

References 

Academic staff of Ben-Gurion University of the Negev
Israeli business theorists
Israeli marketing people
Israeli scientists
Marketing theorists
University of Wisconsin–Milwaukee alumni
Living people
Israeli people of German-Jewish descent
Year of birth missing (living people)